The Pottinger Baronetcy, of Richmond in the County of Surrey, was a title in the Baronetage of the United Kingdom. It was created on 27 April 1840  for Lieutenant-General Henry Pottinger, the first Governor of Hong Kong from 1843 to 1844. His eldest son, the second Baronet, emigrated to Australia where he became a police inspector. The latter was succeeded by his younger brother, the third Baronet. On his death in 1909 the title became extinct.

Eldred Pottinger was the nephew of the first Baronet.

Pottinger baronets, of Richmond (1840)
Sir Henry Pottinger, 1st Baronet (1789–1856)
Sir Frederick William Pottinger, 2nd Baronet (1831–1865)
Sir Henry Pottinger, 3rd Baronet (1834–1909)

References

Extinct baronetcies in the Baronetage of the United Kingdom